Gastropacha populifolia, the poplar lappet,  is a moth of the  family Lasiocampidae. It is found in Southern and Central Europe, through Russia, India and China up to Japan.

The wingspan is 45–65 mm for males and 65–80 mm for females. The moth flies from June to August depending on the location.

The larvae feed on Populus and willow species.

Subspecies
Gastropacha populifolia populifolia
Gastropacha populifolia angustipennis (Walker, 1855)
Gastropacha populifolia mephisto Zolotuhin, 2005

External links

Moths and Butterflies of Europe and North Africa
Lepiforum.de
Photos
schmetterlinge-deutschlands.de 

Lasiocampidae
Moths described in 1784
Moths of Japan
Moths of Europe
Moths of Asia
Taxa named by Eugenius Johann Christoph Esper